The South Pacific Cartel (Spanish: Cártel del Pacífico Sur), is a Mexican organized crime group composed of the remnants of the Beltrán-Leyva Cartel.   It is based in the Mexican state of Morelos. The gang has been significantly less active since mid-2011 when the group's leaders Julio de Jesus Radilla Hernandez and Victor Valdez were captured.

Although they call themselves a 'cartel', the violent gang is a local cell created in April 2010 by Héctor Beltrán Leyva, leader of the Beltran Leyva Cartel. The gang is known for having employed a 12-year-old gunman and executioner.

References 

Organizations established in 2010
2010 establishments in Mexico
Gangs in Mexico
Mexican drug war
Beltrán-Leyva Cartel
Morelos